Guaimaca is a town, with a population of 19,950 (2020 calculation), and a municipality in the Honduran department of Francisco Morazán.

Business
 Agroba, S de R.L. de C.V. coffee grower

References

Municipalities of the Francisco Morazán Department